This is a list of all songs performed by the British band McFly.

Original songs

Cover songs

Songs by Danny Jones
These are solo songs recorded by Danny Jones.
 "Silence Of The City" (composed at the age of 14)
 "Forget All You Know"
 "Look At The Sky"
 "You Should Know By Now"
 "Bittersweet Symphony"

Live cover songs
Here is a list of cover songs that McFly have performed live.
 "American Idiot" (Green Day) - Performed on the Wonderland Tour. Was played during the middle of "5 Colours in Her Hair". Can be found on The Wonderland Tour 2005.
 "Black Or White" (Michael Jackson) - Performed on the Radio:ACTIVE Tour & The Nokia Green Room.
 "Born To Run" (Bruce Springsteen) - Performed on BBC Radio 1.
 "The Boys Are Back In Town" (Thin Lizzy) - Performed at The Prince's Trust Concert.
 "Ghostbusters Theme" (Ray Parker Jr) - Performed at the Motion in the Ocean Tour.
 "Happy Christmas (War Is Over)" (John Lennon) - Performed on BBC Radio 1.
 "Honky Tonk Women" (The Rolling Stones)
 "I Want To Hold Your Hand" (The Beatles) - Performed on Children In Need.
 "I Gotta Feeling" (Black Eyed Peas) -  Performed at the European Tour 2009.
 "Let It Snow" - Performed at the Popworld Christmas Concert.
 "Little Saint Nick" (The Beach Boys) - Performed at the EastEnders Christmas Party.
 "On My Own" (The Used)
 "Pass Out" (Tinie Tempah) Performed at the Above the Noise Tour
 "The Promise" (Girls Aloud) - Performed on the "Up Close... And This Time, It's Personal" tour.
 "Rocks" (Primal Scream) Performed with Charlotte Church on The Charlotte Church Show.
 "YMCA" (Village People) Performed at the Motion in the Ocean Tour.
 "Dynamite" (Taio Cruz)  Performed on Radio 1 Live Lounge and also on their Before the Noise tour.
 "My Heart Will Go On" (Celine Dion) Performed on the McBusted tour by (Dougie Poynter).

Other songs
Only the first three songs in this list have been officially released.

"Diarrhea" or "The Diarrhea Song" (unofficial names for a song played by Dougie Poynter during the Wonderland Tour. Can be heard on The Wonderland Tour 2005).
"Interview with Danny Jones and Tom Fletcher" (from "I Wanna Hold You" CD2)
"Interview" (from "Obviously" CD2)
"We Want to Thank You" (also known as "Want to Thank You", a re-written version of "All About You" performed for Comic Relief 2011, and broadcast in the telephone on 18 March 2011 at roughly 8:00 PM)
"Star Boy" (A remake of Stargirl for ex-BBC Radio 1 host Chris Moyles)
"Hold Me Closer" (featuring Anthony Brant, from Danny's "room" in the website Supercity)
"Honesty" (featuring Vicky Jones) (Also from Danny's "room" in Supercity)
"Na Na Na Lonely" (A demo version of "That's The Truth")
"Beegee's Song" (Written in Atlanta)
"Here Comes The Storm" (An out-take from Above the Noise which was leaked onto YouTube)
"Alone Again (Higher)" (apparently written sometime before 2010 song but has an electro-pop vibe to it, much like the band's 2010 work. It was rumoured to be written for The Saturdays)
"Foolish" (An early version of the "Above the Noise" track)
"This Song" (A demo of "Above the Noise" by Tom Fletcher)
"Teenage" (A demo which wasn't selected to be on the Above the Noise album)
"Save Me" (An alternate version of "Nowhere Left to Run")
"Stars" (A leaked demo of a Tom Fletcher song)
"Dancing Shoes " (A demo which features a clip of the band's elder single "Friday Night, and a more advanced version of 'Little Woman")
"Little Woman" (Acoustic demo of Dancing Shoes and features a snippet of bands Motion In The Ocean single Friday Night)
"I Want, I Want" (A demo by Tom Fletcher, which was later recorded by One Direction for their debut album Up All Night as "I Want".)
"Makin' Luv'" (Originally written as a B-side)
"Sorry, isn't Good Enough" (An early version of "Sorry's Not Good Enough" from Motion in the Ocean).
"Lies, Live Forever" (A power ballad which evolved into their single "Lies")
"It Takes A Little Time" (A demo leaked from The Motion In The Ocean sessions)
"Million Girls" (featuring Carrie Fletcher & Futureboy (James Bourne)) (a demo).
"Cross the River" (A song idea in a video on SuperCity)
"Eastern Side" (A demo Tom played on a webchat on the bands Supercity)

Alternate versions
"5 Colours in Her Hair"
US Version (2006, Just My Luck soundtrack)
Live from Arena Tour (2006, "Please, Please/Don't Stop Me Now" CD2)
"All About You"
Orchestral version (2005, "All About You/You've Got a Friend")
"Ultraviolet/The Ballad of Paul K"
Orchestral version (2005, "Ultraviolet/The Ballad of Paul K" CD1 and All the Greatest Hits)
"Do Ya"
Acoustic version (2008, Radio:Active Woolworths version)
"Falling in Love"
Acoustic version (2008, Radio:Active Woolworths version)
"I Wanna Hold You"
Instrumental (2005, "I Wanna Hold You" CD2)
"Lies"
Johnny Phonett Remix (2008, Radio:Active Townsend bonus disc)
Johnny Phonett Dub (2008, Radio:Active Townsend bonus disc)
"Memory Lane"
Live at the Manchester Arena 2005 (2007, All the Greatest Hits)
"Obviously"
Remix (2004, "Obviously" CD2)
"POV"
Acoustic version (2008, Radio:Active Woolworths version)
"Sorry's Not Good Enough"
Live version (2006, "Sorry's Not Good Enough/Friday Night" CD1)
"Ultraviolet"
Live version (2005, "Ultraviolet/The Ballad of Paul K" CD1)
"Unsaid Things"
US version (2006, Just My Luck album)

See also
 McFly discography
 Wow! 366, a book containing two short stories by Tom Fletcher.

References

External links
Official Website

Mcfly
McFly
McFly